The Town of Fall River, Massachusetts (also known as the Town of Troy, Massachusetts from 1804 to 1834) was led by a Board of Selectmen from 1803 until its re-incorporation as a city in 1854.  
Prior to 1803, it was a part of Freetown and was led by the Freetown Board of Selectmen.

Selectmen (1803–1854)

See also
List of mayors of Fall River, Massachusetts
History of Fall River, Massachusetts

References

Fall River, Massachusetts